The Men Who Explained Miracles, first published in 1963, is a volume of short stories written by John Dickson Carr; the stories feature his series detectives Gideon Fell, Henry Merrivale and Colonel March, of the "Department of Queer Complaints".  This volume of short stories is of the mystery genre, most of the type known as a whodunnit.

Stories

Colonel March, of the Department of Queer Complaints:
"William Wilson's Racket"
"The Empty Flat"
Dr. Gideon Fell:
"The Incautious Burglar" (a shortened and altered version of Death and the Gilded Man)
"Invisible Hands"
Two non-series "Secret Service" stories
"Strictly Diplomatic"
"The Black Cabinet"; this is a story in which an attempt to assassinate Napoleon III is foiled by a contemporaneous historical figure from another context.
Sir Henry Merrivale:
"All in a Maze"

Short story collections by John Dickson Carr
Mystery short story collections
1963 short story collections
Hamish Hamilton books
Harper & Brothers books